Kathy Hawken (born May 13, 1947) is an American politician. She is a member of the North Dakota House of Representatives from the 46th District, serving since 1996. She is a member of the Republican party.

References

Living people
1947 births
Republican Party members of the North Dakota House of Representatives
Politicians from Fargo, North Dakota
21st-century American politicians
Women state legislators in North Dakota
21st-century American women politicians
20th-century American politicians
20th-century American women politicians